Wélton is a given name. Notable people with the name include:

Wélton Araújo Melo (born 1975), Brazilian footballer
Wélton Felipe Marcos Soares (born 1986), Brazilian footballer

See also
Melton (surname)